John Cameron may refer to:

Military 
 John Cameron (British Army officer), British military officer and commander during the French Revolutionary and the Napoleonic Wars
 John Cameron (Royal Navy officer) (1874–1939)
 John Du Cameron (died 1753), Scottish sergeant in the French army
 John Cameron of Fassiefern, Scottish military commander

Politics 
 John Cameron (Alberta politician) (1845–1919), member of Edmonton's first town council
 John Cameron (British politician) (born 1969)
 John Cameron (chief) (1764–1828), Mississauga Ojibwa chief
 John Cameron (Queensland politician, born 1834) (1834–1902), Brisbane businessman and alderman
 John Cameron (Queensland politician, born 1845) (1845–1914), member of the Queensland Legislative Assembly
 John Cameron (Upper Canada politician) (1778–1829), farmer and political figure in Upper Canada
 John Donald Cameron (1858–1923), judge and politician in Manitoba, Canada
 John Hillyard Cameron (1817–1876), French-born Ontario lawyer and politician
 John Macdonald Cameron (1847–1912), British Member of Parliament for Wick Burghs, 1885–1892
 John J. Cameron (1876–1957), Canadian politician
 John Charles Alexander Cameron, member of the House of Commons of Canada

Religion 
 John Cameron (Scottish bishop) (died 1446), bishop of Glasgow
 John Cameron (theologian) (c. 1570–1625), Scottish theologian
 John Cameron (Reformed Presbyterian) (1724–1799), Scottish Presbyterian minister in Ulster
 John Cameron (Canadian bishop) (1827–1910), Canadian Roman Catholic priest and Bishop of Antigonish
 John Urquhart Cameron (born 1943), international athlete and leading Scottish churchman
 John Kennedy Cameron (1860–1944), minister of the Free Church of Scotland

Sports 
 John Cameron (athlete) (1881–1953), Canadian athlete
 John Cameron (footballer, born 1868) (1868–?), Scottish footballer
 John Cameron (footballer, born 1872) (1872–1935), Scottish footballer, played for Queen's Park, Everton & Scotland; player-manager for Tottenham Hotspur
 John Cameron (footballer, born 1875) (1875–1944), Scottish footballer
 Jock Cameron (footballer) (1881–?), played for St. Mirren, Blackburn Rovers and Scotland
 John Cameron (footballer, born 1929), English footballer for Motherwell and Bradford Park Avenue
 John Cameron (New Zealand cricketer) (1898–1988), New Zealand cricketer
 John Cameron (Rangers footballer), played for Rangers and made one appearance for Scotland in 1886
 John Cameron (West Indian cricketer) (1914–2000), West Indian cricketer
 John Joseph Cameron (1882–1954), West Indian cricketer

Other occupations 
 John Cameron (anatomist) (1873–1960), Scottish physician and author
 John Cameron (farmer), Scottish farmer involved with ScotRail
 John Cameron, Lord Abernethy (born 1938), Scottish lawyer
 John Cameron, Lord Cameron (1900–1996), Scottish judge
 John Cameron, Lord Coulsfield (1934–2016), Scottish judge
 John Cameron (musician) (born 1944), British composer, arranger, conductor and musician
 John Cameron (police officer) (1807–1873), law enforcement officer remembered for his work in the New York Draft Riots
 John Cameron (baritone) (1918–2002), Australian operatic baritone
 John A. Cameron (1820–1888), Canadian prospector
 John Allan Cameron (1938–2006), Canadian folk singer
 John E. Cameron (died 1852), American pioneer and politician
 John Cameron (1817–1878), executive officer and director-general of the Ordnance Survey
 John William Cameron (1841–1896), English brewer
 John Brewer Cameron, geodetic surveyor in Australia
 John Cameron (chief), Mississauga Ojibwa chief
 Sir John Cameron of Lochiel, chief of Clan Cameron and Jacobite
 John L. Cameron, American surgeon
 John Cameron, guitar player for the Claw Boys Claw
 John Cameron, Hong Kong police officer and host of Police Report
 Stewart Cameron (nephrologist) (John Stewart Cameron, born 1934) British nephrologist

See also 
 Jack Cameron (disambiguation)
 John Cameron-Cameron, a character played by Dickie Goodman in a series of novelty records